Blue Mountain, Ontario may refer to:

 Blue Mountain (ski resort), a ski resort
 The Blue Mountains, Ontario, a town
 Blue Mountain Formation or Whitby Formation, a geological outcrop in Ontario, Canada

See also 

 Blue Mountain (disambiguation)
 Blue Mountains (disambiguation)